Patinoire des Vernets is an indoor arena located in Geneva, Switzerland. It is primarily used for ice hockey and is the home arena of Genève-Servette HC. Opened in 1958, it has a seating capacity for 7,135 people.

History
When it opened in 1958, the arena had a total of 11,820 spectators. In 1992 a renovation took place, which reduced the capacity to 6,837 places. In 2009 a further modernization took place, whereby more seats were created and the audience capacity rose to 7,202.

The arena hosted the 1962 FIBA Champions Cup final in which Dynamo Tbilisi of Georgia (then Soviet Georgia) defeated Real Madrid 90–83. The 1976 and 1984 finals of the same competition was also hosted at the arena. Patinoire des Vernets also hosted the 1991 cup winners cup final.

See also
 List of indoor arenas in Switzerland

References

External links

Official site

Indoor arenas in Switzerland
Indoor ice hockey venues in Switzerland